This is a list of managers who have been in charge at FC Brașov.

Silviu Ploeşteanu
Silviu Ploeşteanu is the man of records at FC Braşov. In a top of the longest serving football managers at the same club in consecutive years, Mr Silviu Ploeşteanu is fourth with 20 years in charge at Steagul Roşu Braşov (the former name of FC Braşov). Today the club's stadium holds his name. As of 2013, the top six were:

1. Guy Roux, 44 years at AJ Auxerre (1961–2005)

2. Sir Alex Ferguson, 27 years at Manchester United (1986–2013)

3. Sir Matt Busby, 24 years at Manchester United (1945–1969)

4. Silviu Ploeşteanu, 20 years at Steagul Roşu Braşov  (1948–1968)

5. Valeri Lobanovsky, 16 years at Dinamo Kiev (1974–1990)

6. Bill Shankly, 15 years at Liverpool F.C. (1959–1974) and Eugène Gerards, 15 years at OFI Crete (1985–2000)

Managerial history
The list of the FC Brașov managers, as remembered by the statistics:

(Q1) = Qualified for the 1974–75 UEFA Cup First round
(Q2) = Qualified for the 2001–02 UEFA Cup Qualifying round
(R) = Relegated; (P) = Promoted

See also
"Stegarii" în Europa
1963–64 Inter-Cities Fairs Cup
1965–66 Inter-Cities Fairs Cup

References

 
Brasov